Mikus Hill is a hill with a number of bare rock exposures, surmounting the southwest wall of Richardson Glacier in Palmer Land, Antarctica. It was mapped by the United States Geological Survey in 1974, and was named by the Advisory Committee on Antarctic Names for Edward J. Mikus, U.S. Navy, photographer of the cartographic aerial mapping crew in LC-130 aircraft of Squadron VXE-6, 1968–69.

References

Hills of Palmer Land